The Boston mayoral election of 1993 occurred on Tuesday, November 2, 1993, between Acting Mayor Thomas Menino and State Representative James T. Brett. Menino was elected to his first term.

This election came just two years after the prior mayoral election (1991) due to Raymond Flynn—who had been Mayor of Boston since 1984—being appointed United States Ambassador to the Holy See. Following Flynn's appointment in July 1993, Boston City Council president Menino became acting mayor.

The nonpartisan municipal preliminary election was held on September 21, 1993.

Candidates
James T. Brett, Member of the Massachusetts House of Representatives since 1981, Assistant Secretary of Energy from 1980 to 1981
Thomas Menino, Acting Mayor of Boston since July 12, 1993, Boston City Councilor from 1984 to 1993, and Council President in 1993

Candidates eliminated in preliminary
Bruce Bolling, Boston City Councilor since 1982, Council President from 1986 to 1987
Christopher Lydon, WGBH-TV host
Diane Moriarty, attorney
Francis Roache, Boston Police Commissioner
Robert Rufo, Sheriff of Suffolk County
Rosaria Salerno, Boston City Councilor since 1988

Preliminary election

Results

General election

Endorsements

Results

See also
List of mayors of Boston, Massachusetts

References

Mayoral election
Boston mayoral
Boston
Mayoral elections in Boston
Non-partisan elections